Miami University Middletown or Miami Middletown is a satellite campus of Miami University in Middletown, Ohio. It was founded in 1966 and is the oldest regional campus of Miami University and Ohio's first regional campus. It is one of two regional campuses of Miami University.

Academic provision
Miami University Middletown is a commuter campus offering  bachelor's degrees, associate degrees, certificate programs, and beginning course work for most four-year degrees. The average age of Miami Middletown's student body is 24.

Miami University System
 Miami University, Oxford, Ohio (main campus)
 Miami University Hamilton, Hamilton, Ohio
 Miami University Middletown, Middletown, Ohio
 Miami University Dolibois European Center, Luxembourg
 Miami University Voice of America Learning Center- West Chester, Ohio

Athletics

Miami University Middletown is home of the Miami Middletown ThunderHawks. The ThunderHawks field competitive teams in basketball, softball, volleyball, and tennis for women; baseball, basketball, golf and tennis for men. Miami Middletown participates in the United States Collegiate Athletic Association with other regional campuses of Ohio universities including the Miami University Hamilton Harriers.

References

External links
Official website
Athletics website

Miami University
Public universities and colleges in Ohio
Education in Butler County, Ohio
Buildings and structures in Butler County, Ohio
Middletown, Ohio
Educational institutions established in 1966
1966 establishments in Ohio